Ennum Nanmakal is a 1991 Malayalam film directed by Sathyan Anthikkadu and written by Raghunath Paleri. It stars Sreenivasan, Jayaram, Santhi Krishna, in the lead roles, along with Shari, Saranya Ponvannan, KPAC Lalitha, Innocent, Sankaradi, Oduvil Unnikrishnan, Jagadeesh, and Mamukkoya in other pivotal roles.

Plot
Radha Devi is an office assistant working in the city of Kozhikode. She is in love with the unemployed Sivan. Radha Devi moves to Satyavathiyamma's home as a paying guest along with two friends, Indu and Rama. Indu is the head of the housekeeping staff in a hotel; Rama is an associate editor of a magazine and is a feminist. They meet the irascible Dr. Aniruddhan, a widower with a baby girl.

Many comical scenes follow with characters including the local postman Ulpalakshan, a local politician Thotta MLA and compounder Khader. Meanwhile, Sivan suffers due to unemployment and financial difficulties. His self-esteem is questioned by his sister-in-law Devaki and Radha's uncle.

The plot thickens, with Sivan forced to break up with Radha by Radha's uncle and mother as he is unemployed. Later Radha becomes close to Dr. Aniruddhan's baby daughter. Seeing her affection to the kid, Dr.Aniruddhan proposes Radha Devi. Meanwhile, Sivan comes back to meet Radha Devi at Kozhikode with the news that he has secured a job in a company in Calcutta. Brokenhearted, Radha Devi reveals that she has decided to marry Aniruddhan and the marriage is going to be held at a registrar's office in several days' time. Sivan accepts this and leaves, promising to come for the marriage. On the day of marriage, Aniruddhan surprises Radha Devi and Sivan by announcing that he has realized the relationship between Radha and Sivan and the reasons behind their break-up, and that it was them both that should get married that day. Aniruddhan had even arranged Radha's mother and uncle to come there to attend the marriage. Aniruddhan leaves with his child. Sivan and Radha marry.

Cast 

 Sreenivasan as Dr. Anirudhan
 Jayaram as Sivan
 Santhi Krishna as Radha Devi
 Shari as Rama
 Saranya Ponvannan  as Indu
 KPAC Lalitha as PK Satyavathiyamma
 Innocent as Vishwanathan (Thotta MLA)
 Sukumari as Radha's Amma
 Sankaradi as Radha's Ammavan
 Oduvil Unnikrishnan as Balan
 Mamukkoya as Compounder Khader
 Jagadeesh as Ulpalakshan
 Kanakalatha as Devaki
 Thezni Khan as Sharada
 Paravoor Bharathan as Velandi
 Philomina as Bhairavi
 Krishnankutty Nair as Pazhaniyandi
 Bobby Kottarakkara as Ramachandran
 Kaladi Omana As Hostel Matron
 Rajan Padoor as Conductor
 K. T. C. Abdullah as Patient

Soundtrack

The film features songs composed by Johnson and written by Kaithapram.

References

External links
 

1991 films
1990s Malayalam-language films
1991 drama films
Films directed by Sathyan Anthikad
Indian drama films
Films shot in Kozhikode
Films scored by Johnson